Amalia Pellegrini (16 June 1873 – 13 September 1958) was an Italian actress. She appeared in more than sixty films from 1935 to 1958.

Selected filmography

References

External links 

1873 births
1958 deaths
Italian film actresses